Labeobarbus mawambiensis is a species of ray-finned fish in the genus Labeobarbus from the central Congo Basin in Cameroon, the Republic of the Congo and The Democratic Republic of the Congo.

References 

 

mawambiensis
Taxa named by Franz Steindachner
Fish described in 1911